"Turn Back" is a song by English rapper of Greek Cypriot descent K Koke, featuring vocals from British singer Maverick Sabre. The track was released on 23 November 2012 as a digital download in the United Kingdom. The song was released as the lead single from his upcoming debut studio album I Ain't Perfect (2013). It has peaked to number 70 on the UK Singles Chart and number 7 on the UK R&B Chart.

The song samples "Shape of My Heart" by Sting, famously sampled in "The Message" by Nas.

Music video
A music video to accompany the release of "Turn Back" was first released onto YouTube on 26 October 2012 at a total length of four minutes and twelve seconds.

Track listing

Chart performance

Release history

References

2012 debut singles
2012 songs
K Koke songs
Maverick Sabre songs
RCA Records singles
Songs written by Sting (musician)